Delft School may refer to:

Delft School (painting), school in 17th century Dutch painting
Delft School (architecture), school in 20th century Dutch architecture

See also 
 Delft (disambiguation)